Dove si vola is the first studio EP by Italian singer Marco Mengoni. The album peaked at number 9 in the Italian Albums Chart and sold more than 70,000 copies in Italy, receiving Platinum certification from the Federation of the Italian Music Industry.

Background and release 
In December 2009, Mengoni won the third series of the Italian talent show X-Factor. The 7-track EP was recorded during his experience at the singing contest, and it was released on 4 December 2009, two days after he was announced winner of The X-Factor.

Dove si vola includes the previously unreleased song with the same title, written by Bungaro and Saverio Grandi and released as lead single. Mengoni sang it for the first time on 25 November 2009, during the semi-final live show of the talent show. The other tracks are "Lontanissimo da te", and 5 covers of popular Italian and international songs, chosen from the ones that his judge Morgan assigned him during the competition.

Track listing

Charts

Year-end charts

Personnel 

 Marco Mengoni – vocals
 Pietro Caramelli – mastering
 Alessandra Tisato – photography
 Daniela Boccadoro – graphics
 Luca Rustici – arrangements, production, recording, mixing, computer programming, guitars, keyboards
 Valerio Gagliano – studio assistant
 Roberto Di Falco – studio assistant
 Lorenzo Cazzaniga – mastering
 Giancarlo Ippolito – drums
 Gaetano Diodato – bass
 Luciano Luisi – piano, keyboards
 Lucio Fabbri – production, bass, guitar, violin, viola, keyboards
 Alessandro Marcantoni – recording, mixing
 Roberto Gualdi – drums
 Salvo Calvo – guitar
 Stefano Cisotto – keyboards, computer programming
 Carlo Palmas – keyboards, computer programming
 Morgan – arrangements, production
 Piero Calabrese – production, arrangements, Pro Tools programming, keyboards
 Massimo Calabrese – production, bass
 Stella Fabiani – production
 Roberto Procaccini – arrangements, Pro Tools programming, keyboards
 Stefano Calabrese – recording, electric guitar
 Gianluca Vaccaro – mixing
 Marco Del Bene – electric guitar
 Alessandro Canini – drums

References

2009 debut EPs
Marco Mengoni EPs
Sony Music Italy EPs
Italian-language EPs